Matthew Slade is a Paralympian athlete from New Zealand competing mainly in category T37 sprint events.

Slade competed in his first Paralympic Games in 2000 where he won a silver in the T37 200m and a bronze in the T37 100m as well as competing in the T37 400m.  In 2004 he restricted himself to the 100m and 200m and won gold in the later.  He did the same events in the 2008 Summer Paralympics in Beijing but won no medals.

References

External links 
 
 

Paralympic athletes of New Zealand
Athletes (track and field) at the 2000 Summer Paralympics
Athletes (track and field) at the 2004 Summer Paralympics
Athletes (track and field) at the 2008 Summer Paralympics
Paralympic gold medalists for New Zealand
Paralympic silver medalists for New Zealand
Paralympic bronze medalists for New Zealand
New Zealand male sprinters
Living people
Medalists at the 2000 Summer Paralympics
Medalists at the 2004 Summer Paralympics
Year of birth missing (living people)
Paralympic medalists in athletics (track and field)